Invisible Empire is the second studio album from Philadelphia hip-hop artist Reef the Lost Cauze. The album was put out on Gladiator Films records by executive producers Alex Corr and Wiley.

Track listing

Reef the Lost Cauze albums
2003 albums